As of 2021, some 350 species of bird have been recorded in the wild on the Isle of Man, a self-governing island in the Irish Sea between Great Britain and Ireland. Over 100 species breed there, including significant populations of red-billed chough, peregrine falcon and hen harrier.

A variety of seabirds breed on the coastal cliffs such as Atlantic puffin, black guillemot, black-legged kittiwake, European shag and northern fulmar. The island gives its name to the Manx shearwater which formerly nested in large numbers on the Calf of Man. The colony disappeared following the arrival of rats but the shearwaters began to return in the 1960s. The Ayres in the north of the island have colonies of little tern, Arctic tern and common tern.

Moorland areas on the island are home to willow ptarmigan, Eurasian curlew, and northern raven. Woodland birds include long-eared owl, common treecreeper, Eurasian blackcap and common chiffchaff. There is little native woodland on the island and several species found in Great Britain, such as tawny owl, European green woodpecker and Eurasian jay, do not breed on the isle of Man.

Many birds visit the island during the winter and migration seasons including waders such as purple sandpiper, ruddy turnstone, and European golden plover. Wintering wildfowl include small numbers of whooper swan. A bird observatory was established on the Calf of Man in 1959 to study the migrating and breeding birds. By the end of 2001, 99,042 birds of 134 species had been ringed there. Numerous rarities have been recorded there including mourning dove and white-throated robin.

The English names are those recommended by the International Ornithological Congress (IOC). Species marked as A are those for which the Manx Ornithological Society (MOS) requires a written description in order to accept a record.

 (A) Accidental - a species that rarely or accidentally occurs on the Isle of Man
 (I) Introduced - a species introduced to the Isle of Man as a consequence, direct or indirect, of human actions.

Failed introductions such as black grouse or escapee species which were briefly established in the wild such as red-winged laughingthrush are not included on the list.

Ducks, geese, and swans

Order: AnseriformesFamily: Anatidae

Anatidae includes the ducks and most duck-like waterfowl, such as geese and swans. These birds are adapted to an aquatic existence with webbed feet, flattened bills, and feathers that are excellent at shedding water due to an oily coating
 

 Brant goose, Branta bernicla
 Canada goose, Branta canadensis
 Barnacle goose, Branta leucopsis 
 Cackling goose, Branta hutchinsii I
 Snow goose, Anser caerulescens 
 Greylag goose, Anser anser 
 Taiga bean goose, Anser fabalis A
 Pink-footed goose, Anser brachyrhynchus 
 Tundra bean goose, Anser serrirostris
 Greater white-fronted goose, Anser albifrons 
 Mute swan, Cygnus olor 
 Tundra swan, Cygnus columbianus
 Whooper swan, Cygnus cygnus 
 Egyptian goose, Alopochen aegyptiaca A
 Common shelduck, Tadorna tadorna 
 Ruddy shelduck, Tadorna ferruginea A
 Mandarin duck, 	Aix galericulata A
 Garganey, Spatula querquedula A
 Blue-winged teal, Spatula discors A
 Northern shoveler, Spatula clypeata 
 Gadwall, Mareca strepera 
 Eurasian wigeon, Mareca penelope 
 American wigeon, Mareca americana A
 Mallard, Anas platyrhynchos 
 Northern pintail, Anas acuta 
 Eurasian teal, Anas crecca 
 Green-winged teal, Anas carolinensis A
 Red-crested pochard, Netta rufina A
 Common pochard, Aythya ferina 
 Ferruginous duck, Aythya nyroca A
 Ring-necked duck, Aythya collaris A
 Tufted duck, Aythya fuligula 
 Greater scaup, Aythya marila 
 King eider, Somateria spectabilis A
 Common eider, Somateria mollissima 
 Surf scoter, Melanitta perspicillata A
 Velvet scoter, Melanitta fusca
 Common scoter, Melanitta nigra 
 Long-tailed duck, Clangula hyemalis 
 Common goldeneye, Bucephala clangula
 Smew, Mergellus albellus A
 Common merganser, Mergus merganser 
 Red-breasted merganser, Mergus serrator 
 Ruddy duck, Oxyura jamaicensis I

Pheasants, grouse, and allies
Order: GalliformesFamily: Phasianidae
These are terrestrial species of gamebirds, feeding and nesting on the ground. They are variable in size but generally plump, with broad and relatively short wings.

 Willow ptarmigan, Lagopus lagopus 
 Grey partridge, Perdix perdix 
 Golden pheasant, Chrysolophus pictus I
 Common pheasant, Phasianus colchicus I
 Common quail, Coturnix coturnix 
 Red-legged partridge, Alectorix rufa I

Nightjars and allies
Order: CaprimulgiformesFamily: Caprimulgidae

Nightjars are medium-sized nocturnal birds that usually nest on the ground. They have long wings, short legs and very short bills. Most have small feet, of little use for walking, and long pointed wings. Their soft plumage is camouflaged to resemble bark or leaves.

 European nightjar, Caprimulgus europaeus

Swifts
Order: ApodiformesFamily: Apodidae

Swifts are small birds which spend the majority of their lives flying. These birds have very short legs and never settle voluntarily on the ground, perching instead only on vertical surfaces. Many swifts have long swept-back wings which resemble a crescent or boomerang.

 Alpine swift, Apus melba A
 Common swift, Apus apus

Cuckoos

Order: CuculiformesFamily: Cuculidae

The family Cuculidae includes cuckoos, roadrunners and anis. These birds are of variable size with slender bodies, long tails and strong legs. The Old World cuckoos are brood parasites.

 Great spotted cuckoo, Clamator glandarius A
 Yellow-billed cuckoo, Coccyzus americanus A
 Common cuckoo, Cuculus canorus

Sandgrouse
Order: PterocliformesFamily: Pteroclidae

Sandgrouse have small, pigeon like heads and necks, but sturdy compact bodies. They have long pointed wings and sometimes tails and a fast direct flight. Flocks fly to watering holes at dawn and dusk. Their legs are feathered down to the toes.

 Pallas's sandgrouse, Syrrhaptes paradoxus A

Pigeons and doves

Order: ColumbiformesFamily: Columbidae

Pigeons and doves are stout-bodied birds with short necks and short slender bills with a fleshy cere.

 Rock dove (feral pigeon), Columba livia 
 Stock dove, Columba oenas 
 Common wood pigeon, Columba palumbus 
 European turtle dove, Streptopelia turtur A
 Eurasian collared dove, Streptopelia decaocto 
 Mourning dove, Zenaida macroura A

Rails, gallinules, and coots
Order: GruiformesFamily: Rallidae

Rallidae is a large family of small to medium-sized birds which includes the rails, crakes, coots and gallinules. Typically they inhabit dense vegetation in damp environments near lakes, swamps or rivers. In general they are shy and secretive birds, making them difficult to observe. Most species have strong legs and long toes which are well adapted to soft uneven surfaces. They tend to have short, rounded wings and to be weak fliers.

 Water rail, Rallus aquaticus 
 Corn crake, Crex crex 
 Spotted crake, Porzana porzana A
 Common moorhen, Gallinula chloropus
 Eurasian coot, Fulica atra 
 Baillon's crake, Porzana pusilla A

Cranes
Order: GruiformesFamily: Gruidae

Cranes are large, long-legged and long-necked birds. Unlike the similar-looking but unrelated herons, cranes fly with necks outstretched, not pulled back. Most have elaborate and noisy courting displays or "dances".

 Common crane, Grus grus A

Grebes

Order: PodicipediformesFamily: Podicipedidae

Grebes are small to medium-large freshwater diving birds. They have lobed toes and are excellent swimmers and divers. However, they have their feet placed far back on the body, making them quite ungainly on land.

 Little grebe, Tachybaptus ruficollis 
 Red-necked grebe, Podiceps grisegena A
 Great crested grebe, Podiceps cristatus 
 Horned grebe, Podiceps auritus A
 Black-necked grebe, Podiceps nigricollis A

Stone-curlews
Order: CharadriiformesFamily: Burhinidae

The stone-curlews are a group of largely tropical waders in the family Burhinidae. They are found worldwide within the tropical zone, with some species also breeding in temperate Europe and Australia. They are medium to large waders with strong black or yellow-black bills, large yellow eyes and cryptic plumage. Despite being classed as waders, most species have a preference for arid or semi-arid habitats.

 Eurasian stone-curlew, Burhinus oedicnemus A

Oystercatchers

Order: CharadriiformesFamily: Haematopodidae

The oystercatchers are large and noisy plover-like birds, with strong bills used for smashing or prising open molluscs.

 Eurasian oystercatcher, Haematopus ostralegus

Stilts and avocets
Order: CharadriiformesFamily: Recurvirostridae

Recurvirostridae is a family of large wading birds, which includes the avocets and stilts. The avocets have long legs and long up-curved bills. The stilts have extremely long legs and long, thin, straight bills.

 Pied avocet, Recurvirostra avosetta A

Plovers and lapwings

Order: CharadriiformesFamily: Charadriidae

The family Charadriidae include the plovers, dotterels and lapwings. They are small to medium-sized birds with compact bodies, short, thick necks and long, usually pointed, wings. They are found in open country worldwide, mostly in habitats near water.

 Northern lapwing, Vanellus vanellus 
 European golden plover, Pluvialis apricaria 
 American golden plover, Pluvialis dominica A
 Grey plover, Pluvialis squatarola 
 Common ringed plover, Charadrius hiaticula 
 Little ringed plover, Charadrius dubius A
 Kentish plover, Charadrius alexandrinus A
 Eurasian dotterel, Charadrius morinellus A

Sandpipers and allies

Order: CharadriiformesFamily: Scolopacidae

Scolopacidae is a large diverse family of small to medium-sized shorebirds including the sandpipers, curlews, godwits, shanks, tattlers, woodcocks, snipes, dowitchers and phalaropes. The majority of these species eat small invertebrates picked out of the mud or soil. Variation in length of legs and bills enables multiple species to feed in the same habitat, particularly on the coast, without direct competition for food.

 Eurasian whimbrel, Numenius phaeopus 
 Eurasian curlew, Numenius arquata
 Bar-tailed godwit, Limosa lapponica 
 Black-tailed godwit, Limosa limosa
 Ruddy turnstone, Arenaria interpres 
 Red knot, Calidris canutus 
 Ruff, Calidris pugnax 
 Broad-billed sandpiper, Calidris falcinellus A
 Stilt sandpiper, Calidris himantopus A
 Curlew sandpiper, Calidris ferruginea
 Temminck's stint, Calidris temminckii A 
 Sanderling, Calidris alba 
 Dunlin, Calidris alpina 
 Purple sandpiper, Calidris maritima
 Baird's sandpiper, Calidris bairdii A
 Little stint, Calidris minuta 
 White-rumped sandpiper, Calidris fuscicollis A
 Buff-breasted sandpiper, Calidris subruficollis A
 Pectoral sandpiper, Calidris melanotos A
 Long-billed dowitcher, Limnodromus scolopaceus A
 Eurasian woodcock, Scolopax rusticola 
 Jack snipe, Lymnocryptes minimus 
 Great snipe, Gallinago minima A 
 Common snipe, Gallinago gallinago 
 Wilson's phalarope, Phalaropus tricolor A
 Red-necked phalarope, Phalaropus lobatus A
 Red phalarope, Phalaropus fulicarius A
 Common sandpiper, Actitis hypoleucos 
 Green sandpiper, Tringa ochropus A
 Lesser yellowlegs, Tringa flavipes A
 Common redshank, Tringa totanus 
 Wood sandpiper, Tringa glareola A
 Spotted redshank, Tringa erythropus A
 Common greenshank, Tringa nebularia

Gulls terns, and skimmers

Order: CharadriiformesFamily: Laridae

Laridae is a family of medium to large seabirds, the gulls, terns, and skimmers. Gulls are typically grey or white, often with black markings on the head or wings. They have stout, longish bills and webbed feet. Terns are a group of generally medium to large seabirds typically with grey or white plumage, often with black markings on the head. Most terns hunt fish by diving but some pick insects off the surface of fresh water. Terns are generally long-lived birds, with several species known to live in excess of 30 years.

 Black-legged kittiwake, Rissa tridactyla 
 Sabine's gull, Xema sabini A
 Black-headed gull, Chroicocephalus ridibundus 
 Little gull, Hydrocoloeus minutus 
 Mediterranean gull, Ichthyaetus melanocephalus A
 Common gull, Larus canus
 Ring-billed gull, Larus delawarensis A
 Great black-backed gull, Larus marinus 
 Glaucous gull, Larus hyperboreus 
 Iceland gull, Larus glaucoides 
 European herring gull, Larus argentatus 
 Yellow-legged gull, Larus michahellis A
 Lesser black-backed gull, Larus fuscus 
 Sandwich tern, Thalasseus sandvicensis 
 Little tern, Sternula albifrons
 Bridled tern, Onychoprion anaethetus A
 Roseate tern, Sterna dougallii A
 Common tern, Sterna hirundo 
 Arctic tern, Sterna paradisaea 
 Black tern, Chlidonias niger A

Skuas and jaegers

Order: CharadriiformesFamily: Stercorariidae

The family Stercorariidae are, in general, medium to large birds, typically with grey or brown plumage, often with white markings on the wings. They nest on the ground in temperate and arctic regions and are long-distance migrants.

 Great skua, Stercorarius skua 
 Pomarine jaeger, Stercorarius pomarinus A
 Parasitic jaeger, Stercorarius parasiticus 
 Long-tailed jaeger, Stercorarius longicaudus A

Auks, murres, and puffins

Order: CharadriiformesFamily: Alcidae

Alcids are superficially similar to penguins due to their black-and-white colours, their upright posture and some of their habits, however they are not related to the penguins and differ in being able to fly. Auks live on the open sea, only deliberately coming ashore to nest.

 Little auk, Alle alle A
 Common murre, Uria aalge 
 Razorbill, Alca torda 
 Great auk, Pinguinus impennis, extinct
 Black guillemot, Cepphus grylle 
 Atlantic puffin, Fratercula arctica

Loons

Order: GaviiformesFamily: Gaviidae

Loons, known as divers in Europe, are a group of aquatic birds found in many parts of North America and northern Europe. They are the size of a large duck or small goose, which they somewhat resemble when swimming, but to which they are completely unrelated.

 Red-throated loon, Gavia stellata 
 Black-throated loon, Gavia arctica 
 Great northern loon, Gavia immer 
 Yellow-billed loon, Gavia adamsii A

Northern storm petrels

Order: ProcellariiformesFamily: Hydrobatidae

The northern storm petrels are relatives of the petrels and are the smallest seabirds. They feed on planktonic crustaceans and small fish picked from the surface, typically while hovering. The flight is fluttering and sometimes bat-like.

 European storm petrel, Hydrobates pelagicus 
 Leach's storm petrel, Hydrobates leucorrhous

Petrels and shearwaters
Order: ProcellariiformesFamily: Procellaridae

The procellariids are the main group of medium-sized "true petrels", characterised by united nostrils with medium septum and a long outer functional primary.

 Northern fulmar, Fulmarus glacialis 
 Scopoli's shearwater, Calonectris diomedea A
 Cory's shearwater, Calonectris borealis A
 Sooty shearwater, Ardenna griseus 
 Great shearwater, Ardenna gravis A
 Manx shearwater, Puffinus puffinus
 Yelkouan shearwater, Puffinus yelkouan A
 Balearic shearwater, Puffinus mauretanicus A
 Tropical shearwater, Puffinus bailloni A
 Barolo shearwater, Puffinus baroli A

Storks
Order: CiconiiformesFamily: Ciconiidae

Storks are large, long-legged, long-necked, wading birds with long, stout bills. Storks are mute, but bill-clattering is an important mode of communication at the nest. Their nests can be large and may be reused for many years. Many species are migratory.

 White stork, Ciconia ciconia

Frigatebirds
Order: SuliformesFamily: Fregatidae

Frigatebirds are large seabirds usually found over tropical oceans. They are large, black-and-white or completely black, with long wings and deeply forked tails. The males have coloured inflatable throat pouches. They do not swim or walk and cannot take off from a flat surface. Having the largest wingspan-to-body-weight ratio of any bird, they are essentially aerial, able to stay aloft for more than a week.

 Magnificent frigatebird, Fregata magnificens A

Boobies and gannets
Order: SuliformesFamily: Sulidae

The sulids comprise the gannets and boobies. Both groups are medium to large coastal seabirds that plunge-dive for fish.

 Northern gannet, Morus bassanus

Cormorants and shags

Order: SuliformesFamily: Phalacrocoracidae

Phalacrocoracidae is a family of medium to large coastal, fish-eating seabirds that includes cormorants and shags. Plumage coloration varies, with the majority having mainly dark plumage, some species being black-and-white, and a few being colorful.

 Great cormorant, Phalacrocorax carbo 
 European shag, Gulosus aristotelis

Ibises and spoonbills
Order: PelecaniformesFamily: Threskiornithidae

Threskiornithidae is a family of large terrestrial and wading birds which includes the ibises and spoonbills. They have long, broad wings with 11 primary and about 20 secondary feathers. They are strong fliers and despite their size and weight, very capable soarers.

 Eurasian spoonbill, Platalea leucorodia A

Herons and bitterns

Order: PelecaniformesFamily: Ardeidae

The family Ardeidae contains the bitterns, herons and egrets. Herons and egrets are medium to large wading birds with long necks and legs. Bitterns tend to be shorter necked and more wary. Members of Ardeidae fly with their necks retracted, unlike other long-necked birds such as storks, ibises and spoonbills.

 Eurasian bittern, Botaurus stellaris A
 Little bittern, Ixobrychus minutus A
 Black-crowned night heron, Nycticorax nycticorax A
 Western cattle egret, Bubulcus ibis A
 Grey heron, Ardea cinerea 
 Purple heron, Ardea purpurea A
 Great egret, Ardea alba A
 Little egret, Egretta garzetta

Ospreys
Order: AccipitriformesFamily: Pandionidae

The osprey is a medium-large raptor which is a specialist fish-eater.

 Western osprey, Pandion haliaetus

Hawks, eagles, and kites

Order: AccipitriformesFamily: Accipitridae

Accipitridae is a family of birds of prey, which includes hawks, eagles, kites, harriers and Old World vultures. These birds have powerful hooked beaks for tearing flesh from their prey, strong legs, powerful talons and keen eyesight.

 European honey buzzard, Pernis apivorus A
 Golden eagle, Aquila chrysaetos A
 Eurasian sparrowhawk, Accipiter nisus 
 Northern goshawk, Accipiter gentilis A
 Western marsh harrier, Circus aeruginosus A
 Hen harrier Circus cyaneus 
 Pallid harrier Circus macrourus A
 Montagu's harrier Circus pygargus
 Red kite, Milvus milvus A
 Black kite, Milvus migrans A
 White-tailed eagle, Haliaaetus albicilla A
 Rough-legged buzzard, Buteo lagopus A
 Common buzzard, Buteo buteo

Barn owls
Order: StrigiformesFamily: Tytonidae

Barn owls are medium to large owls with large heads and characteristic heart-shaped faces. They have long strong legs with powerful talons.

 Western barn owl, Tyto alba A

Owls

Order: StrigiformesFamily: Strigidae

The typical owls are small to large solitary nocturnal birds of prey. They have large forward-facing eyes and ears, a hawk-like beak and a conspicuous circle of feathers around each eye called a facial disk.

 Little owl, Athene noctua A
 Eurasian scops owl, Otus scops A
 Long-eared owl, Asio otus
 Short-eared owl, Asio flammeus 
 Snowy owl, Bubo scandiaca A
 Tawny owl, Strix aluco A

Hoopoes

Order: BucerotiformesFamily: Upupidae

Hoopoes have black, white and orangey-pink colouring with a large erectile crest on their head. 

 Eurasian hoopoe, Upupa epops A

Rollers
Order: CoraciiformesFamily: Coraciidae

Rollers resemble crows in size and build, but are more closely related to the kingfishers and bee-eaters. They share the colourful appearance of those groups with blues and browns predominating. The two inner front toes are connected, but the outer toe is not.

 European roller, Coracias garrulus A

Kingfishers

Order: CoraciiformesFamily: Alcedinidae

Kingfishers are medium-sized birds with large heads, long, pointed bills, short legs and stubby tails.

 Common kingfisher, Alcedo atthis A

Bee-eaters
Order: CoraciiformesFamily: Meropidae

The bee-eaters are a group of near passerine birds in the family Meropidae. Most species are found in Africa but others occur in southern Europe, Madagascar, Australia and New Guinea. They are characterised by richly coloured plumage, slender bodies and usually elongated central tail feathers. All are colourful and have long downturned bills and pointed wings, which give them a swallow-like appearance when seen from afar.

 European bee-eater, Merops apiaster A

Woodpeckers
Order: PiciformesFamily: Picidae

Woodpeckers are small to medium-sized birds with chisel-like beaks, short legs, stiff tails and long tongues used for capturing insects. Some species have feet with two toes pointing forward and two backward, while several species have only three toes. Many woodpeckers have the habit of tapping noisily on tree trunks with their beaks.

 Eurasian wryneck, Jynx torquilla A
 Great spotted woodpecker, Dendrocopos major 
 European green woodpecker, Picus viridis

Falcons and caracaras

Order: FalconiformesOrder: FalconiformesFamily: Falconidae
Family: Falconidae

Falconidae is a family of diurnal birds of prey. They differ from hawks, eagles and kites in that they kill with their beaks instead of their talons.

 Common kestrel, Falco tinnunculus 
 Red-footed falcon, Falco vespertinus A
 Merlin, Falco columbarius 
 Eurasian hobby, Falco subbuteo A
 Gyrfalcon, Falco rusticolus A 
 Peregrine falcon, Falco peregrinus

Old World parrots
Order: PsittaciformesFamily: Psittaculidae

Characteristic features of parrots include a strong curved bill, an upright stance, strong legs, and clawed zygodactyl feet. Many parrots are vividly colored, and some are multi-colored. Old World parrots are found from Africa east across south and southeast Asia and Oceania to Australia and New Zealand.

 Rose-ringed parakeet, Psittacula krameri I

Shrikes
Order: PasseriformesFamily: Laniidae

Shrikes are passerine birds known for their habit of catching other birds and small animals and impaling the uneaten portions of their bodies on thorns. A typical shrike's beak is hooked, like a bird of prey.

 Red-backed shrike, Lanius collurio A
 Great grey shrike, Lanius excubitor A
 Woodchat shrike, Lanius senator A

Vireos, shrike-babblers, and erpornis
Order: PasseriformesFamily: Vireonidae

The vireos are a group of small to medium-sized passerine birds. They are typically greenish in color and resemble wood warblers apart from their heavier bills.

Red-eyed vireo, Vireo olivaceus A

Old World orioles
Order: PasseriformesFamily: Oriolidae

The Old World orioles are colourful passerine birds. They are not related to the New World orioles.

 Eurasian golden oriole, Oriolus oriolus A

Crows, jays, and magpies

Order: PasseriformesFamily: Corvidae

The family Corvidae includes crows, ravens, jays, choughs, magpies, treepies, nutcrackers and ground jays. Corvids are above average in size among the Passeriformes, and some of the larger species show high levels of intelligence.

 Eurasian jay, Garrulus glandarius A
 Eurasian magpie, Pica pica 
 Red-billed chough, Pyrrhocorax pyrrhocorax 
 Western jackdaw, Corvus monedula 
 Rook, Corvus frugilegus 
 Carrion crow, Corvus corone 
 Hooded crow, Corvus cornix
 Northern raven, Corvus corax

Waxwings
Order: PasseriformesFamily: Bombycillidae

The waxwings are a group of birds with soft silky plumage and unique red tips to some of the wing feathers. In the Bohemian and cedar waxwings, these tips look like sealing wax and give the group its name. These are arboreal birds of northern forests. They live on insects in summer and berries in winter.

 Bohemian waxwing, Bombycilla garrulus

Tits, chickadees, and titmice

Order: PasseriformesFamily: Paridae

The Paridae are mainly small stocky woodland species with short stout bills. Some have crests. They are adaptable birds, with a mixed diet including seeds and insects.

 Coal tit, Periparus ater 
 Marsh tit, Poecile palustris A
 Eurasian blue tit, Cyanistes caeruleus 
 Great tit, Parus major

Bearded reedling
Order: PasseriformesFamily: Panuridae

This species, the only one in its family, is found in reed beds throughout temperate Europe and Asia.

 Bearded reedling, Panurus biarmicus A

Larks

Order: PasseriformesFamily: Alaudidae

Larks are small terrestrial birds with often extravagant songs and display flights. Most larks are fairly dull in appearance. Their food is insects and seeds.

 Woodlark, Lullula arborea A
 Eurasian skylark, Alauda arvensis 
 Horned lark, Eremophila alpestris A
 Greater short-toed lark, Calandrella brachydactyla 
 Calandra lark, Melanocorypha calandra A

Swallows

Order: PasseriformesFamily: Hirundinidae

The family Hirundinidae is adapted to aerial feeding. They have a slender streamlined body, long pointed wings and a short bill with a wide gape. The feet are adapted to perching rather than walking, and the front toes are partially joined at the base.

 Sand martin, Riparia riparia 
 Barn swallow, Hirundo rustica 
 Common house martin, Delichon urbicum 
 Red-rumped swallow, Cecropis daurica A

Long-tailed tits
Order: PasseriformesFamily: Aegithalidae

Long-tailed tits are a group of small passerine birds with medium to long tails. They make woven bag nests in trees. Most eat a mixed diet which includes insects.

 Long-tailed tit, Aegithalos caudatus

Leaf warblers

Order: PasseriformesFamily: Phylloscopidae

Leaf warblers are a family of small insectivorous birds found mostly in Eurasia and ranging into Wallacea and Africa. The species are of various sizes, often green-plumaged above and yellow below, or more subdued with grayish-green to grayish-brown colors.

 Wood warbler, Phylloscopus sibalatrix 
 Western Bonelli's warbler, Phylloscopus bonelli A
 Eastern Bonelli's warbler, Phylloscopus orientalis A
 Yellow-browed warbler, Phylloscopus inornatus A
 Pallas's leaf warbler, Phylloscopus proregulus A
 Radde's warbler, Phylloscopus schwarzi A
 Dusky warbler, Phylloscopus fuscatus A
 Willow warbler, Phylloscopus trochilus 
 Common chiffchaff, Phylloscopus collybita 
 Iberian chiffchaff, Phylloscopus ibericus A
 Greenish warbler, Phylloscopus trochiloides A

Reed warblers and allies

Order: PasseriformesFamily: Acrocephalidae

The members of this family are usually rather large for "warblers". Most are rather plain olivaceous brown above with much yellow to beige below. They are usually found in open woodland, reedbeds, or tall grass. The family occurs mostly in southern to western Eurasia and surroundings, but it also ranges far into the Pacific, with some species in Africa.

 Great reed warbler, Acrocephalus arundinaceus A
 Aquatic warbler, Acrocephalus paludicola A
 Sedge warbler, Acrocephalus schoenobaenus 
 Paddyfield warbler, Acrocephalus agricola A
 Blyth's reed warbler, Acrocephalus dumetorum A
 Eurasian reed warbler, Acrocephalus scirpaceus 
 Marsh warbler, Acrocephalus palustris A
 Melodious warbler, Hippolais polyglotta A
 Icterine warbler, Hippolais icterina A

Grassbirds and allies
Order: PasseriformesFamily: Locustellidae

Locustellidae are a family of small insectivorous songbirds found mainly in Eurasia, Africa, and the Australian region. They are smallish birds with tails that are usually long and pointed, and tend to be drab brownish or buffy all over.

 Lanceolated warbler, Locustella lanceolata A
 Common grasshopper warbler, Locustella naevia

Sylviid warblers and allies

Order: PasseriformesFamily: Sylviidae

The family Sylviidae is a group of small insectivorous passerine birds. They mainly occur as breeding species, as the common name implies, in Europe, Asia and, to a lesser extent, Africa. Most are of generally undistinguished appearance, but many have distinctive songs.

 Eurasian blackcap, Sylvia atricapilla 
 Garden warbler, Sylvia borin 
 Barred warbler, Curruca nisoria A
 Lesser whitethroat, Curruca curruca
 Asian desert warbler, Curruca nana A
 Sardinian warbler, Curruca melanocephala A
 Western subalpine warbler, Curruca iberiae A
 Eastern subalpine warbler, Curruca cantillans A
 Common whitethroat, Curruca communis

Kinglets
Order: PasseriformesFamily: Regulidae

The kinglets, also called crests, are a small group of birds often included in the Old World warblers, but frequently given family status because they also resemble the titmice.

 Common firecrest, Regulus ignicapilla A
 Goldcrest, Regulus regulus

Wrens
Order: PasseriformesFamily: Troglodytidae

The wrens are mainly small and inconspicuous except for their loud songs. These birds have short wings and thin down-turned bills. Several species often hold their tails upright. All are insectivorous.

 Eurasian wren, Troglodytes troglodytes

Nuthatches
Order: PasseriformesFamily: Sittidae

Nuthatches are small woodland birds. They have the unusual ability to climb down trees head first, unlike other birds which can only go upwards. Nuthatches have big heads, short tails and powerful bills and feet.

 Eurasian nuthatch, Sitta europaea A

Treecreepers

Order: PasseriformesFamily: Certhiidae

Treecreepers are small woodland birds, brown above and white below. They have thin pointed down-curved bills, which they use to extricate insects from bark. They have stiff tail feathers, like woodpeckers, which they use to support themselves on vertical trees.

 Eurasian treecreeper, Certhia familiaris

Starlings
Order: PasseriformesFamily: Sturnidae

Starlings are small to medium-sized Old World passerine birds with strong feet. Their flight is strong and direct and most are very gregarious. Their preferred habitat is fairly open country, and they eat insects and fruit. The plumage of several species is dark with a metallic sheen.

 Rosy starling, Pastor roseus A
 Common starling, Sturnus vulgaris

Thrushes and allies

Order: PasseriformesFamily: Turdidae

The thrushes are a group of passerine birds that occur mainly in the Old World. They are plump, soft plumaged, small to medium-sized insectivores or sometimes omnivores, often feeding on the ground. Many have attractive songs.

 Song thrush, Turdus philomelos 
 Mistle thrush, Turdus viscivorus 
 Redwing, Turdus iliacus
 Common blackbird, Turdus merula 
 Fieldfare, Turdus pilaris 
 Ring ouzel, Turdus torquatus

Old World flycatchers

Order: PasseriformesFamily: Muscicapidae

Old World flycatchers are a large group of small passerine birds native to the Old World. They are mainly small arboreal insectivores. The appearance of these birds is highly varied, but they mostly have weak songs and harsh calls.

 Spotted flycatcher, Muscicapa striata 
 European robin, Erithacus rubecula 
 Bluethroat, Luscinia svecica A
 Thrush nightingale, Luscinia luscinia A
 Common nightingale, Luscinia megarhynchos A
 White-throated robin, Irania gutturalis A
 Red-flanked bluetail, Tarsiger cyanurus A
 Red-breasted flycatcher, Ficedula parva A
 European pied flycatcher, Ficedula hypoleuca A
 Black redstart, Phoenicurus ochruros 
 Common redstart, Phoenicurus phoenicurus 
 Whinchat, Saxicola rubetra 
 European stonechat, Saxicola rubicola 
 Northern wheatear, Oenanthe oenanthe 
 Desert wheatear, Oenanthe deserti A
 Western black-eared wheatear, Oenanthe hispanica A

Dippers
Order: PasseriformesFamily: Cinclidae

Dippers are a group of perching birds whose habitat includes aquatic environments in the Americas, Europe and Asia. They are named for their bobbing or dipping movements.

White-throated dipper, Cinclus cinclus

Old World sparrows
Order: PasseriformesFamily: Passeridae

Old World sparrows are small passerine birds. In general, sparrows tend to be small, plump, brown or grey birds with short tails and short powerful beaks. Sparrows are seed eaters, but they also consume small in

 Eurasian tree sparrow, Passer montanus 
 House sparrow, Passer domesticus

Accentors

Order: PasseriformesFamily: Prunellidae

The accentors are in the only bird family, Prunellidae, which is completely endemic to the Palearctic. They are small, fairly drab species superficially similar to sparrows.

 Dunnock, Prunella modularis

Wagtails and pipits

Order: PasseriformesFamily: Motacillidae

Motacillidae is a family of small passerine birds with medium to long tails. They include the wagtails, longclaws and pipits. They are slender, ground feeding insectivores of open country.

 Western yellow wagtail, Motacilla flava A
 Grey wagtail, Motacilla cinerea 
 White wagtail, Motacilla alba 
 Richard's pipit, Anthus richardi A
 Tawny pipit, Anthus campestris A
 Meadow pipit, Anthus pratensis 
 Tree pipit, Anthus trivialis A
 Olive-backed pipit, Anthus hodgsoni A
 Pechora pipit, Anthus gustavi A
 Red-throated pipit, Anthus cervinus A
 Water pipit, Anthus spinoletta A
 European rock pipit, Anthus petrosus

Finches, euphonias, and allies

Order: PasseriformesFamily: Fringillidae

Finches are seed-eating passerine birds, that are small to moderately large and have a strong beak, usually conical and in some species very large. All have twelve tail feathers and nine primaries. These birds have a bouncing flight with alternating bouts of flapping and gliding on closed wings, and most sing well.

 Common chaffinch, Fringilla coelebs 
 Brambling, Fringilla montifringilla 
 Hawfinch, Coccothraustes coccothraustes A
 Eurasian bullfinch, Pyrrhula pyrrhula A
 Common rosefinch, Carpodacus erythrinus A
 European greenfinch, Chloris chloris 
 Twite, Linaria flavirostris 
 Common linnet, Linaria cannabina 
 Common redpoll, Acanthis flammea A
 Lesser redpoll, Acanthis cabaret 
 Arctic redpoll, Acanthis hornemanni A
 Red crossbill, Loxia curvirostris 
 European goldfinch, Carduelis carduelis 
 European serin, Serinus serinus A
 Eurasian siskin, Spinus spinus

Longspurs and arctic buntings
Order: PasseriformesFamily: Calcariidae

The Calcariidae are a family of birds that had been traditionally grouped with the New World sparrows, but differ in a number of respects and are usually found in open grassy areas.

 Lapland longspur, Calcarius lapponicus A
 Snow bunting, Plectrophenax nivalis

Old World buntings

Order: PasseriformesFamily: Emberizidae

The emberizids are a large family of passerine birds. They are seed-eating birds with distinctively shaped bills. Many emberizid species have distinctive head patterns.

 Corn bunting, Emberiza calandra 
 Yellowhammer, Emberiza citrinella 
 Ortolan bunting, Emberiza hortulana A
 Cirl bunting, Emberiza cirlus A
 Little bunting, Emberiza pusilla A
 Rustic bunting, Emberiza rustica A
 Black-headed bunting, Emberiza melanocephala A
 Common reed bunting, Emberiza schoeniclus

New World sparrows
Order: PasseriformesFamily: Passerellidae

Until 2017, these species were considered part of the family Emberizidae. Most of the species are known as sparrows, but these birds are not closely related to the Old World sparrows which are in the family Passeridae. Many of these have distinctive head patterns.

 Dark-eyed junco, Junco hyemalis A
 White-throated sparrow, Zonotrichia albicollis A
 Song sparrow, Melospiza melodia A

Troupials and allies
Order: PasseriformesFamily: Icteridae

The icterids are a group of small to medium-sized, often colorful passerine birds restricted to the New World and include the grackles, New World blackbirds, and New World orioles. Most species have black as a predominant plumage color, often enlivened by yellow, orange, or red.

 Baltimore oriole, Icterus galbula A, rare

New World warblers
Order: PasseriformesFamily: Parulidae

The wood-warblers are a group of small often colorful passerine birds restricted to the New World. Most are arboreal, but some are more terrestrial. Most members of this family are insectivores.

 Myrtle  warbler, Dendroica coronata A

See also
 Biota of the Isle of Man
 List of birds
 Lists of birds by region

References

Footnotes

General references
 Manx Birdlife (2009) The Manx List 2009 - Categories A, B and C. Retrieved 7 August 2012.

External links
 Manx Birdlife
 Isle of Man birding

Animals in the Isle of Man
Isle of Man-related lists
Isle of Man
Isle of Man